The phrase International Marketplace is used to describe many ventures including:

 Year round
International Marketplace (San Pablo, California)
International Market Place (in Waikiki)
International Marketplace, Las Vegas, a grocery store in Las Vegas, Nevada
 Seasonal events
International Marketplace, Toronto, Canada